Antonio Cárdenas could refer to:

Antonio Cárdenas Rodríguez (1903–1969), Mexican Air Force officer
Antonio Cárdenas Guillén (1962–2010), Mexican drug lord
Tony Cárdenas (born 1963), American politician